The Battle of Elands River may refer to:
Battle of Elands River (1900), an action fought in August 1900, when a Boer party laid siege to a British supply dump, defended by a predominantly Australian force, at Brakfontein Drift along the Elands River
Battle of Elands River (1901), also known as the Battle of Moddersfontein, which took place in September 1901

Crocodile River (Limpopo)